A butter pie is a traditional English savoury pie consisting mainly of onions and potatoes. It is also sometimes served on a savoury barm cake. The pie is stocked by chip shops, sandwich shops, local corner shops and some supermarkets within Lancashire. It is also known as Catholic pie, Friday pie, air pie or a special.

History 

The pie is known to have been created for workers from Lancashire's Catholic community, to consume on days (mainly Friday) when meat could not be eaten.

From 2006, the butter pie was included in the annual World Pie Eating Championship in Wigan, in the vegetarian category.

Butter pies were served on match days at Deepdale, the stadium of Preston North End F.C. until 2007 when the providers, Ashworth Foods Ltd, ceased trading. With the new providers, Holland's Pies not offering a butter pie, two Preston North End fans started a campaign on Facebook calling for the return of butter pies to the matchday menu. In 2010 the butter pie made a return to Preston North End's Deepdale stadium after the huge demand for the pie.

This dish is also mentioned in the Paul and Linda McCartney song "Uncle Albert/Admiral Halsey", which contains the lyrics, "I had another look and I had a cup of tea and butter pie".

Areas served 

The butter pie is served in most areas of the historic boundaries of Lancashire, including Blackburn, Blackpool, Bolton, Burnley, Bury, Chorley, Lancaster, Preston, St Helens and Wigan (whose residents are sometimes known by the nickname pie-eaters).

See also 

 Pâté aux pommes de terre
 List of pies, tarts and flans

References

Further reading 
 Divided by pie. The Guardian.

British pies
English cuisine
Foods featuring butter
Lancashire cuisine
Preston, Lancashire
Savoury pies